Grant Henry (born April 3, 1979), better known by his stage name Stemage, is an American guitarist and composer. He is known for his video game and television soundtracks, including Cartoon Network's animated series Steven Universe. He is also known for his involvement in several video game cover projects, including Metroid Metal and Viking Guitar.

Career

Early work (1997-2002) 

Stemage began writing and performing music in high school. He recorded an original album in 1997 named Organized Uproar, using a cassette 8-track in his dorm room. The album was later released for free via his website. He then joined a band named MiniVoid.

Metroid Metal and solo work (2003-2014) 
In 2003, Stemage formed Metroid cover project Metroid Metal, later recruiting other artists such as Danimal Cannon. While the group were initially simply recording cover songs to release online, Metroid Metal made their live debut at MAGfest 7 in 2009, and became a recurring act at the event. Stemage released several albums with the group over the following years, including Varia Suite (2009), Expansion Pack (2010) and Other Album (2014). Stemage along with the other musicians from Metroid Metal Live formed the "backbone" of Yes Mayhem, a second band that produced original material beginning in 2010. During this time, he released five albums as a solo artist, both in the form of cover projects and original material. In 2010, Stemage was hired to perform the soundtrack for the Xbox Live game Alpha Squad. In an interview shortly before the game's release, he described composing for video games as "acting on a blue screen with a director telling you that the Master Control Program is off in the distance, and it's big – except that there's no director, and the MCP is a sketch of a dude with a gun."

Collaborative projects and Steven Universe (2014-2019) 
Stemage joined Viking Guitar in 2014, alongside Travis Morgan, Mega Beardo, and founder Erik Peabody. Viking Guitar originated as a solo act fronted by Peabody, with which Stemage had featured as a guest on several occasions. The new incarnation of the band released their debut studio album Legion later that year, while continuing the annual Danse Macabre projects that Stemage had been involved in earlier. In 2018, the group released their second studio album, Warpath.

Stemage had a brief tenure with LONELYROLLINGSTARS, working on their 2014 album CARNIVORTEX and performing live at MAGFest 12 to support the release. His departure later in the year was announced by the band in the form of a music video. During the video, Stemage walks out midway through a performance of Royal Rainbow Road to be replaced by new guitarist Mega Beardo.

In addition to the opening theme for the second season of Cartoon Network's Steven Universe, Stemage worked on guitars throughout the remainder of the show. The first volume of the Steven Universe soundtrack reached #22 on the Billboard 200. A second volume followed in 2019, peaking at #28 on the Billboard 200, and #12 on the US iTunes chart. Stemage also co-composed Steven Universe: The Movie.

In 2018, Stemage joined a band called Super Strikers, along with video game composers Keiji Yamagishi and Manami Matsumae. The group performed live for the first time at MAGFest 2018, the recordings of which were used for the second disc of Yamagishi's album The Retro-Active Experience.

Focus on soundtracks (2019-) 
From the late 2010s onwards, Stemage worked on a number of game soundtracks including Card of Darkness (2019), Ikenfell (2020) and Hextech Mayhem (2021), both as a composer and as a session guitarist. When discussing his work on the Bubsy: Paws on Fire! soundtrack, which was released via video game music label Materia Collective, Stemage indicated that it was a challenging but enjoyable project, adding "If you hear a hi-hat playing Morse code during one of the songs, don't say I didn't warn you."

Style and influences
He has described his music as "Catchy, high-energy space rock mixed with metal, pop, and prog". He has cited stylistic influences such as Failure, Stone Temple Pilots, Self, Hum, Meshuggah, and Shiner.

Discography

Studio albums
 Organized Uproar (1998)
 Strati (2006)
 Zero over Zero (2011)
 Frets of Valmar: Grandia II (2011)
 Where Good Marbles Go to Die (2012)
 Priority One (2013)
 Narrowband (2016)
 Retrogression (2017)
 Spookage, Vol 1 (2022)

MiniVoid
 14 Days (1999)
 Readjust (2000)

Metroid Metal
 Varia Suite (2009)
 Expansion Pack EP (2010)
 Other Album (2014)

Yes Mayhem
 Yes Mayhem (2010)
 HH2 (2012)
 Super VG Christmas Party (2014, as guest)
 Molly (2016)
 Castellum Sanguis LXVIII: Castlevania X68000 Tribute Album (2018, as guest)
 Bandwagon (2020)

LONELYROLLINGSTARS
 CARNIVORTEX (2014)

Viking Guitar
 Viking Guitar (2010, as guest)
 Made of Metal (2011, as guest)
 Danse Macabre (2012, as guest)
 Danse Macabre II (2013, as guest)
 Legion (2014)
 Danse Macabre III (2014)
 Danse Macabre IV (2015)
 Danse Macabre V (2016)
 Danse Macabre VI (2017)
 Warpath (2018)
Live (2018)
 God Gave Rock 'n' Roll to You (2020)
 Danse Macabre 7 (2020)
 Belly of the Beast (2021)
 Hello, Boils and Ghouls! (2021)

Super Strikers
 The Retro-Active Experience (2019)
 Card of Darkness: The Remixes (2019, as guest)

 Soundtracks 
TV and film
 For Catherine (2005)
 Steven Universe (2013–19, with Aivi & Surasshu)
 Steven Universe: The Movie (2019, with many others)
 Steven Universe Future (2019–20, with Aivi & Surasshu)
 Battle Kitty (2022– present, with Max Coburn)

Video games
 Alpha Squad (2011)
 Saturday Morning RPG (2012, with Vince DiCola and C-Jeff)
 Aeternum (2013, with Viking Guitar)
 Band Saga (2014, with Rekcahdam)
 The Metronomicon: Slay the Dance Floor (2016, with many others)
 Runner3 (2018)
 Bubsy: Paws on Fire! (2019)
 Card of Darkness (2019)
 Ikenfell (2020, with Aivi & Surasshu)
 Dangle Dash (2021)
 Space Otter Charlie (2021)
 Chicory: A Colorful Tale (2021, with Lena Raine)
 Moonglow Bay (2021, with Lena Raine)
 Hextech Mayhem (2021)
 Soundfall (2022, with many others)
 Rogue Legacy 2 (2022, with many others)

 Devolver Digital events 

 Devolver Digital Direct 2020 - Play the Game Devolver Digital Direct 2021 - Daydream Devolver Digital Summer Game Fest 2022 - Singularity Guest appearances 
 Off Centre – The Streets We've Known All our Lives (2004)
 The Nurse who Loved Me: A Tribute to Failure (2008)
 C-Jeff – Preschtale (2012)
 Disasterpeace – Cycles (2012)
 Perelandra Records – Tide (2012)
 Disasterpeace – FZ: Side F (2013)
 Random Encounter – Let Me Tell You a Story (2013)
 C-Jeff – Big Steel Wheels (2013)
 Nate Horsfall – Spectrum of Mana (2013)
 Chiptunes = Win - Chiptunes = WTFLOL (2013)
 Brave Wave Productions – In Flux (2014, with Manami Matsumae)
 Big Giant Circles – Glory Days Remixed (2014)
 Alexander Brandon – Just Fun (2014)
 Careless Juja – For Naughty Children (2015)
 Keiji Yamagishi – Retro-Active Pt. 1 (2015)
 Patient Corgi – SOUND WAVES: A Tribute to Ecco the Dolphin (2016)
 Nate Horsfall – Chronicles of Time (2016)
 Aivi & Surrashu – Rio Olympics Google Doodle (2016)
 Keiji Yamagishi – Retro-Active Pt. 2 (2016)
 Brave Wave Productions – World 1–2 (2017)
 Manami Matsumae – Three Movements (2017)
 Jon Poulin – With Vigor (2017)
 Chiptunes = Win – Chips = Flipped (2018)
 Sam Mulligan & The Donut Slayers – Shark Party (2018)
 Jon Poulin - Big Riff Energy Bossies play Bosses - A Tribute to Matt Wood (2021)
 MunzadetH - A Tribute to KICK MASTER'' (2021)

References

1979 births
Living people
American rock guitarists
American rock drummers
American rock singers
Video game composers
American television composers
American film score composers